The New South Wales Minister for Aboriginal Affairs is a minister in the Government of New South Wales with responsibility for administering legislation and policy in relation to that state's indigenous Australians in the state of New South Wales, Australia.

The current Minister for Aboriginal Affairs is Ben Franklin, who also holds the portfolios of the Arts and Regional Youth, appointed with effect from 21 December 2021. The minister assists the lead portfolio minister, the Deputy Premier, Paul Toole, who was appointed with effect from 6 October 2021. Together the ministers administer the portfolio through Aboriginal Affairs NSW, an agency of the Department of Premier and Cabinet, as well as a range of additional government agencies.

Ultimately, the minister is responsible to the Parliament of New South Wales.

Office history
The first Minister for Aboriginal Affairs, Frank Walker, was appointed by the Labor Government of Neville Wran on 2 October 1981 and a "Ministry of Aboriginal Affairs" was established on 1 January 1982. This role replaced the Aboriginal Affairs responsibilities of the Minister for Youth and Community Services (the last being Kevin Stewart). Prior to 1969 Aboriginal Affairs was within the purview of the Chief Secretary. The new ministry had responsibilities for advising the Government on "how and where land rights for Aboriginal people might be granted" and for the provision of services to Aboriginal communities.

On 15 April 1988, the Ministry was abolished and its responsibilities were transferred to the new "Bureau of Aboriginal Affairs" within the Premier’s Department. The Bureau was renamed to the "Office of Aboriginal Affairs" by June 1988 and was charged with the administration of the Aboriginal Land Rights Act, 1983 (NSW) and the administration of Aboriginal Land Councils. On 1 July 1993, the Office of Aboriginal Affairs was established as an administrative office independent of the Premier's Department responsible to the Minister for Aboriginal Affairs.

On 6 April 1995 the Office was abolished and was transferred to the "Department of Aboriginal Affairs". On 1 July 2009 the Department was abolished as an independent body and was subordinated to the new Department of Human Services. On 4 April 2011, the Department was renamed "Aboriginal Affairs NSW" and was transferred to the Department of Education and Communities within the Office of Communities. In July 2015 the Office of Communities was abolished but Aboriginal Affairs remained within the parent Department of Education.

Following the 2019 state election, Aboriginal Affairs NSW was transferred from the Department of Education to the Department of Premier and Cabinet, with Don Harwin appointed as Minister for the Public Service and Employee Relations, Aboriginal Affairs, and the Arts.

List of ministers

See also 

List of New South Wales government agencies

References

External links
 Aboriginal Affairs NSW

Aboriginal Affairs
New South Wales
1981 establishments in Australia